The 1958 Los Angeles Rams season was the team's 21st year with the National Football League and the 13th season in Los Angeles.

Schedule

Roster
Jon Arnett
Leon Clarke
Paige Cothren
QB Billy Wade
Tommy Wilson

Season summary

Week 6

Standings

References

Los Angeles Rams
Los Angeles Rams seasons
Los Angeles Rams